The 2017 Copa CONMEBOL Libertadores de Futsal was the 17th edition of the Copa Libertadores de Futsal, South America's premier club futsal tournament organized by CONMEBOL.

The tournament was hosted by Peru and played from 22 to 28 May 2017.

Teams
The competition was contested by 12 teams: one entry from each of the ten CONMEBOL associations, plus the title holders and an additional entry from the host association.

Notes

Venues
The two venues in Lima were:
Polideportivo 1 of the National Sports Village (VIDENA) of the Peruvian Sports Institute (IPD), with capacity for 2000 people.
Coliseum of the Sports Complex of the Peruvian Football Federation (FPF), with capacity for 800 people.

Draw
The draw of the tournament was held on 28 April 2017, 11:00 PET (UTC−5), at the headquarters of the Peruvian Football Federation in Lima. The 12 teams were drawn into three groups of four containing one team from each of the four seeding pots. The following three teams were seeded:
Group A: champions of the host association, Primero de Mayo (Peru)
Group B: 2016 Copa Libertadores de Futsal champions, Cerro Porteño (Paraguay)
Group C: representatives of the association of the 2016 Copa Libertadores de Futsal runners-up, Carlos Barbosa (Brazil)

The other teams were seeded based on the results of their association in the 2016 Copa Libertadores de Futsal.

Squads
Each team had to submit a squad of 14 players, including a minimum of two goalkeepers (Regulations Article 4.1).

Match officials
A total of 18 referees were appointed for the tournament.

Group stage
The top two teams of each group and the two best third-placed teams advanced to the quarter-finals. The teams were ranked according to points (3 points for a win, 1 point for a draw, 0 points for a loss). If tied on points, tiebreakers were applied in the following order (Regulations Article 6.2):
Results in head-to-head matches between tied teams (points, goal difference, goals scored);
Goal difference in all matches;
Goals scored in all matches;
Drawing of lots.

All times were local, PET (UTC−5).

Group A

Group B

Group C

Ranking of third-placed teams

In the quarter-finals:
The 1st best runner-up would play the winner of Group B.
The 2nd best runner-up would play the winner of Group A.

Knockout stage
In the quarter-finals, semi-finals and final, extra time and penalty shoot-out were used to decide the winner if necessary. In the third place match, penalty shoot-out (no extra time) were used to decide the winner if necessary.

Bracket

Quarter-finals

Semi-finals

Third place match

Final

References

External links
Copa Libertadores Futsal Perú 2017, CONMEBOL.com

2017
2017 in South American futsal
2017 in Peruvian football
May 2017 sports events in South America
International futsal competitions hosted by Peru